Santos (Saints) is a municipality in the Brazilian state of São Paulo, founded in 1546 by the Portuguese nobleman Brás Cubas. It is located mostly on the island of São Vicente, which harbors both the city of Santos and the city of São Vicente, and partially on the mainland. It is the main city in the metropolitan region of Baixada Santista. The city is home to the Coffee Museum, where world coffee prices were once negotiated. There is also a football memorial, dedicated to the city's greatest players, which includes Pelé, who spent the majority of his career with Santos Futebol Clube. Its beachfront garden,  in length, figures in Guinness World Records as the largest beachfront garden in the world.

History

Early colonization
There are reports about the island of São Vicente just two years after the official discovery of Brazil, in 1502, with the expedition of Amerigo Vespucci to explore the Brazilian coast. When passing through the island formerly named Goiaó (or Guaiaó) by the natives, the expedition decided to give it the name of Sao Vincente, for the day's saint. 
However, in 1531, due to the decline of the Portuguese crown's business in India, Brazil rose on importance. King D. João III sent for a squad for the demarcation of territories on the island of São Vicente. The captain, Martim Afonso de Sousa, discovered a small village and a dock, known as Porto de São Vicente. One of the exiles brought by Amerigo Vespucci's expedition, Cosme Fernandes, had founded the trading village, which had boomed. Miguel Alfonso took the town by force, granting land on the island to settlers.

In 1543, with the completion of the construction of a chapel on a hillock in honor of Santa Catarina by Luís de Góis, Brás Cubas ordered the port to be moved to the site of Enguaguaçu, which was calmer. The town booked to facilitate the trade that was unlocked with this move. The Portuguese nobleman ordered the construction of Brazil's second, and at the time only hospital, as Hospital da Santa Casa de Misericórdia is closed, similar to the Santa Casa de Lisboa. The hospital was called Santa Casa de Misericórdia de Todos os Santos in Olinda was closed.  The new town of Enguaguaçu was then known as the town of Todos os Santos. There is speculation that the name Santos would come from the port of Santos in Lisbon, similar to the location of the new settlement. Hence, the region close to Outeiro was known as "Vila do Porto de Santos", and later, just "Santos".

Twentieth Century
The export of coffee from the Port of Santos gave rise to the city and mostly accounted for the wealth of the city at the turn of the 20th century. Export and import through its port have made it the modern city one finds today and turned it into the indispensable outlet for the production of the powerhouse that is São Paulo State. Adorning the landscape of the port city are the canals that are over a hundred years old. In 1899, Santos was the point of entry for the bubonic plague into Brazil. In 1924 it became the seat of the Roman Catholic Diocese of Santos.

In October 2006, light crude oil was discovered off the coast in the Santos basin.

Santos became a tourist city from the 1910s onwards, with the construction of the International Hotel and Parque Balneário and the construction of the beach front gardens in 1935. To this day, tourism in Santos is one of the main economic activities, mainly linked to beaches and historical heritage.

Geography
Santos is about 31 km (19 mi) from the metropolis São Paulo, capital of the state São Paulo, which is also the most populous city in Brazil.

The municipality contains the Laje de Santos Marine State Park, created in 1993, the first marine park to be created by the state.
It is divided into two distinct geographic areas: the heavily urbanized island and the continental area, about 70% of which is protected.  The areas differ radically in terms of population, economy and geography.

Insular area
Santos partially lies on the island of São Vicente (Saint Vincent), whose territory is divided with the neighboring municipality of São Vicente. It is a densely urbanized area of  that houses almost all the inhabitants of the city. It includes a flat area - Plain Coastal extension of the State of São Paulo - which has altitudes that rarely go above twenty meters above sea level, and an area composed of isolated hills called the Mass of São Vicente, the former home and endowed an urban illegal occupation with a mix of families characterized by high and low incomes,  whose height does not exceed 200 meters above sea level.

The flat region of the island is almost completely devoid of native vegetation, although in the north region of the island - especially in the Alemoa, Chico de Paula and Saboó neighbourhoods - there are still remnants of mangroves. Before the occupation of the area of the island by 'chácaras' - rural residences, and subsequently by urbanization, there was a vast flooded land covered by mangroves, the native Atlantic Forest, and coastal vegetation.

On the city hills one can still find vast areas covered by the native Atlantic Forest, in spite of the existing chácaras and banana harvesting farms in the area. The 'Lagoa da Saudade' (Homesickness Lagoon), a pond located in one of the aforementioned hills, Morro Nova Cintra, was known to host a kind of caiman. The lagoon is also a popular destination among families in the city due to its playgrounds, barbecue kiosks, picnic spots and green areas. The disordered occupation of the hills represents both an environmental as well as a geological risk: the deforestation leads to frequent landslides, mainly from January to March, the traditional rainy season in the region.

Most rivers in the island were channeled when engineer Saturnino de Brito designed the system of canals in the city. As examples, we can cite the rivers Dois Rios ("Two Rivers") and Ribeirão dos Soldados ("Soldiers Creek"), which is nowadays referred by santistas as the 'Canal 4' on Avenue Siqueira Campos.

Major water courses cut the island in the north, such as the Rio de São Jorge (St. George River), which suffers from the problems of pollution and silting due to the occupation of its banks by slums.

Beaches

José Menino Beach
Pompeia Beach
Gonzaga Beach
Boqueirão Beach
Embaré Beach
Aparecida Beach
Ponta da Praia Beach

Islands
 Urubuqueçaba Island
 Barnabé Island
 Diana Island

Climate
Despite the fact that it is located just outside the tropics, Santos has a tropical rainforest climate (Köppen: Af) with no real dry season. Tropical rainforest climates are typically found near the equator, so Santos featuring this type of climate is an exceptional situation. All months of the year averages more than 60 mm of rainfall during the course of the year. Santos features warm weather throughout the year, though June in Santos is somewhat cooler (and drier) than January. Mean temperatures in the city are around 19 °C during wintertime and around 25 °C in the summer months. Precipitation in Santos is very high, amounting to around  annually.

Economy

The Port of Santos is the biggest seaport in Latin America, which handled 96 million tons and 2.7 million TEUs in 2010. It has large industrial complexes and shipping centers, which handle a large portion of the world's coffee exports, as well as a number of other Brazilian exports including steel, oil, cars, oranges, bananas and cotton.

As of 2014, the municipality of Santos was the 6th largest exporting city, by value, in Brazil by trading $4.36B (USD) worth of goods. The top four products exported from Santos were raw sugar (23% of total exports), refined petroleum (16%), coffee (15%), and soybeans (13%).

Transportation

Airport and Air Force Base
Santos Air Force Base - BAST, a base of the Brazilian Air Force, is located in  the adjoining city of Guarujá.

The city will be served by Guarujá Civil Metropolitan Aerodrome, located in Guarujá.

Notable people 
 Gilmar (1930-2013), former Santos FC football player and two-time FIFA World Cup champion (1958 and 1962) with Brazil national football team
 Pepe (1935-), former Santos FC football player and two-time FIFA World Cup champion (1958 and 1962) with Brazil national football team
 Neymar (1992-), former Santos FC football player, top goalscorer of the Brazil national football team with Pelé

Twin towns – sister cities

Santos is twinned with:

 Alajuela, Costa Rica
 Ansião, Portugal
 Arouca, Portugal
 Cádiz, Spain
 Callao, Peru
 Coimbra, Portugal
 Colón, Panama
 Constanța, Romania
 Fernando de la Mora, Paraguay
 Funchal, Portugal
 Havana, Cuba
 Kenitra, Morocco
 Nagasaki, Japan
 Ningbo, China
 Porto, Portugal
 Rizhao, China
 Shimonoseki, Japan
 Taizhou, China
 Trieste, Italy
 Ulsan, South Korea
 Ushuaia, Argentina
 Veracruz, Mexico
 Viseu, Portugal

See also

 Santos-Jundiaí Railroad
 Line 9 (CPTM)
 Line 10 (CPTM)
 All Saints' Church
 Santos tramways
 Trolleybuses in Santos
 Engenho dos Erasmos

References

External links

  

 
Port cities in Brazil
Populated coastal places in São Paulo (state)
Populated places established in 1546
1546 establishments in the Portuguese Empire